Voltage 2.3: Remixed and Revisited is the second full-length album by Canadian Cyberpunk/Industrial metal band Left Spine Down. The album was released on March 3, 2009 via Synthetic Sounds and features 3 newly recorded songs along with remixes and segues. The new songs being "Welcome to the Future" along with covers of "Territorial Pissings" by Nirvana and "She's Lost Control" by Joy Division.

Track listing

References

External links
Left Spine Down Official Site
Synthetic Sounds Official Site
Fighting for Voltage on Amazon.ca
Fighting for Voltage on Amazon MP3 Store

Left Spine Down albums
2009 remix albums